Dimitrios Politis (born 8 March 1995) is a Greek professional footballer who plays as a goalkeeper for Ilioupoli.

References

1995 births
Living people
Football League (Greece) players
Super League Greece 2 players
Panionios F.C. players
Panegialios F.C. players
Panserraikos F.C. players
Apollon Pontou FC players
Veria F.C. players
Association football goalkeepers
Footballers from Athens
Greek footballers